A freeze stat is a temperature sensing device for HVAC that monitors a heat exchanger to prevent its coils from freezing.  Freeze stats can be used on both refrigerant-to-air, and refrigerant-to-liquid type heat exchangers and serve different purposes with similar goals for each.

Air coil 

The purpose of an air coil freeze stat is to keep the refrigerant-to-air heat exchanger (commonly called air coils) from freezing.  This kind of freeze stat is typically used for heating coils which are exposed to outside air and is usually installed on the supply air side of the coil.  To accomplish this, they typically shut down the flow of outside air to a mixing box when the temperature reaches a predetermined setpoint.  The setpoint for air coil freeze stats is typically about 12°C which is approximately when the dew point temperature of the air starts to drop below freezing point.

Water coil

The water coil freeze stat performs a similar function to the air coil freeze stat, but is used on a different type of HVAC system.  Its function is to keep the freon-to-liquid heat exchanger (commonly called liquid coils) from freezing.

In practical situations, when an air coil freeze stat is not used, bypassed, or defeated, the air coil can freeze, and this causes a lack of air flow to the facility.  By contrast, when a water coil freeze stat is not used, the water coil can get so cold that it can freeze the cooling liquid in the exchanger and burst the exchanger.  A ruptured heat exchanger mixes contaminants such as freon and oil into the coolant. The intrusion of coolant into the delicately balanced refrigeration system can cause expensive damage to components such as the freon compressor, and the reversing valve.

Mechanical

Conceptually, mechanical freeze stats are constructed with a diaphragm, a capillary tube and bulb, and an electric switch. The capillary tube allows gas movement to and from the capillary bulb and the diaphragm with a fall or rise in temperature, respectively.  When the temperature reaches a specific setpoint, the pressure in the diaphragm will trip a switch which typically shuts down the flow of outside air while the capillary bulb's temperature is at or below the setpoint.  Mechanical freeze stats can have more than one set of contacts, and the contacts can be NO or NC.
Disadvantages
 Capillary tube easily kinked during installation limiting effectiveness
 Sensing bulb must be mounted horizontally
 Diaphragm case must be mounted in a separate, warmer location for effective operation
Advantages
 Typically inexpensive
 Easily understood wiring

Digital

Digital freeze stats, also known as electronic or solid state freeze stats, use an electronic circuit, microprocessor, or microcontroller in place of the mechanical freeze stat's diaphragm and switch.  They also use one or more electric or electronic sensors in place of the capillary tube and bulb for temperature sensing.  Digital freeze stats utilizing microcontrollers or microprocessors can also perform more advanced functions than simply opening or closing switch contacts. Digital freeze stats can perform seemingly intelligent operations such as reversing the refrigerant flow and using some building heat to thaw a freon-to-liquid heat exchanger and then restoring the refrigerant flow to its normal direction once the danger of freezing the water coil has been averted.
Disadvantages
 Requires power to operate
 Typically higher cost than mechanical freeze stats
 More complex wiring installation
Advantages
 Multiple sensors
 Sensors can be near or far
 No capillary tube kinking issue
 No capillary tube leaking issue
 Operate in any position
 Operate in varying temperatures
 Programmable actions and setpoints
 Can perform functions other than opening or closing a single switch

See also
 Crankcase heater
 Heat exchanger
 Reversing valve
 Thermal expansion valve
 Thermostat

References

Heating, ventilation, and air conditioning